Saint-Jean-Chrysostome was a former parish municipality in Le Haut-Saint-Laurent Regional County Municipality in the Montérégie region of Quebec.

On September 29, 1999, it amalgamated into the municipality of Saint-Chrysostome.

References

Former municipalities in Quebec
Populated places disestablished in 1999